The Florida Department of Transportation (FDOT) is a decentralized agency charged with the establishment, maintenance, and regulation of public transportation in the state of Florida. The department was formed in 1969. It absorbed the powers of the State Road Department (SRD).  The current Secretary of Transportation is Jared W. Perdue.

History
The State Road Department, the predecessor of today's Department of Transportation, was authorized in 1915 by the Florida Legislature. For the first two years of its existence, the department acted as an advisory body to the 52 counties in the state, helping to assemble maps and other information on roads.

The 1916 Bankhead Act passed by Congress expanded the department's responsibilities and gave it the authority to: establish a state and state-aid system of roads, engage in road construction and maintenance, acquire and own land, exercise the right of eminent domain, and accept federal or local funds for use in improving roads.

The Office of Motor Carrier Compliance created in 1980 transitioned from the Florida Department of Transportation to the Florida Highway Patrol (FHP) division of the Florida Department of Highway Safety and Motor Vehicles (FLHSMV) on July 1, 2011. The consolidation is a result of Senate Bill 2160, passed by lawmakers during the 2011 Legislative Session, and placed the commercial vehicle licensing, registrations, fuel permits, and enforcement all under the purview of DHSMV.

Structure
The Florida Transportation Commission, made up of nine commissioners chosen by Florida's Governor and Legislature, provides oversight for the state's department of transportation.

Each of FDOT's eight semi-autonomous districts is managed by a district secretary. Following the 2002 legislation, the Turnpike District (now known as Florida's Turnpike Enterprise, or FTE) secretary became known as an executive director.

There are seven geographic districts plus the FTE. The FTE owns and maintains  of toll roads. The department also owns and maintains other toll roads and bridges: the Sunshine Skyway Bridge, Alligator Alley, the Beachline East Expressway, the Pinellas Bayway System, and the Seminole and Lake County portions of otherwise Central Florida Expressway Authority owned roads. Tolls on all Department-owned facilities are collected by Florida's Turnpike Enterprise.

In addition, the FDOT operates and manages several park-and-ride lots and Commuter Assistance Programs throughout the state. The seven districts each have a Districtwide Commuter Assistance Program.

Districts

Florida has seven transportation districts and a separate unit for tolled facilities under Florida's Turnpike Enterprise. Each district is managed by a district secretary. Each district also has major divisions for administration, planning, production, and operations.

Notable projects
In 1954, the State Road Department completed the original Sunshine Skyway Bridge, the first fixed span to connect Saint Petersburg directly to Bradenton. This greatly shortened the travel time between the two cities, as before cars would have to either use a ferry or drive about  around Tampa Bay. A parallel span was completed in 1971 to make the bridge Interstate standard, and it became part of I-275. After the newer, southbound span was destroyed in 1980 when the SS Summit Venture collided into it, a replacement bridge was finished in 1987.

In 1974, FDOT completed Florida's Turnpike, a  limited access toll highway that connected the panhandle area through Orlando to Miami. The turnpike is part of an initiative to finance transportation with user fees.

In 2021, FDOT funded a review by scientists from Florida State University, University of Talca and The Hong Kong Polytechnic University, which showed following advantages of on autonomous trains:
 Eliminating sources for human errors
 Raise of capacity by stronger utilization of existing rail tracks
 Reduction of operational costs. Metro Paris reduced its operational costs in case of GoA4 by 30%.
 Higher overall service reliability 
 Better fleet management and service flexibility 
 Energy efficiency

See also
Florida State Highway System
Bridge Software Institute at the University of Florida

References

Further reading

External links

Transportation in Florida
State departments of transportation of the United States
State agencies of Florida
Government of Florida
Government agencies established in 1969
1969 establishments in Florida
Organizations based in Tallahassee, Florida